Bruce Livingston (11 May 1927 – 25 December 2014) was an Australian cricketer. He played one first-class match for New South Wales in 1956/57.

See also
 List of New South Wales representative cricketers

References

External links
 

1927 births
2014 deaths
Australian cricketers
New South Wales cricketers
Cricketers from Sydney